Myriane Samson (born September 9, 1988) is a Canadian former competitive figure skater. She is a two-time Canadian national medalist (silver in 2011, bronze in 2010). Her highest ISU Championship placements were 8th at the 2010 Four Continents and 10th at the 2008 World Junior Championships.

Life and career 
Myriane Samson was born in Greenfield Park, Quebec. She began skating at age five.

In the 2003–04 season, Samson debuted on the ISU Junior Grand Prix series, winning a silver medal in Croatia, and became the Canadian national junior champion. The following season, she made her first appearance on the senior national level but remained a junior internationally.

In 2007, Samson was sent to her first World Junior Championships and finished 18th. She placed 10th at the 2008 World Junior Championships. In autumn 2008, she began appearing in senior international events. After winning bronze at the 2010 Canadian Championships, she received assignments to her first senior ISU Championships. She placed eighth at the 2010 Four Continents Championships and 29th at the 2010 World Championships.

Samson won the silver medal at the 2011 Canadian Championships. She was subsequently named in Canada's team to the 2011 Four Continents, where she finished 11th, and the World Championships. She withdrew from Worlds due to a knee injury.

On November 1, 2012, Samson announced her retirement from competitive skating.

Programs

Competitive highlights 
GP: Grand Prix; JGP: Junior Grand Prix

References

External links 

 

1988 births
Canadian female single skaters
French Quebecers
Living people
Sportspeople from Longueuil
People from Saint-Jean-sur-Richelieu